Spain entered the Eurovision Song Contest 1998, held in Birmingham, United Kingdom. Televisión Española (TVE) internally selected Mikel Herzog to represent Spain with the song "¿Qué voy a hacer sin ti?"  (What Am I Going to Do Without You?).

Before Eurovision
In order to select Spanish entry for 1998 contest, Spanish broadcaster TVE held an internal selection. Ultimately, Mikel Herzog was internally selected with the song "¿Qué voy a hacer sin ti?". He was announced as the representative of Spain on March 5, 1998.

At Eurovision
Heading into the final of the contest, BBC reported that bookmakers ranked the entry joint 20th out of the 25 entries. Herzog performed fourth in the running order, following France and preceding Switzerland. He received 21 points for his performance, coming 16th.
Spain originally gave its 12 points to Israel and 10 to Norway. After the broadcast it was announced that the Spanish broadcaster had wrongly tallied the votes and Germany should have received 12 points instead of zero, as shown during the broadcast. The mistake was corrected and thus Germany received the 12 points. Israel and Norway both received 2 points less than originally and Croatia, Malta, Portugal, the United Kingdom, the Netherlands, Belgium, Estonia and Turkey all received one point less than indicated during the broadcast.

Voting

References

See also 
Spain in the Eurovision Song Contest
Eurovision Song Contest 1998

1998
Countries in the Eurovision Song Contest 1998